Min Raza (also known as Ilias Shah; 1480–1514) was king of Arakan from 1502 to 1513. He was the father of King Min Bin (r. 1531–1554).

According to the Arakanese chronicles, he is said to be utterly uninterested in governing the country, except for his annual elephant hunting trips to the Thandwe region. He even stayed away from the capital Mrauk-U, moving to the old capital city of Wethali in 1510. His lack of interest in governing led to his eventual fall from power and death. In late 1513, Raza was forced to abdicate after failing to quell a serious rebellion by the Thet people, who occupied Wethali for 29 days. The ministers chose his 15-year-old son by a concubine, Gazapati, who had put down the rebellion, to take over the throne. Though he was treated well at first, the fallen king was later executed by his son after hearing the rumors that his father's chief queen Saw Thuba was plotting.

Notes

References

Bibliography
 

Monarchs of Mrauk-U
1480 births
1514 deaths
16th century in the Mrauk-U Kingdom
16th-century Burmese monarchs